Triarchy of the Lost Lovers is the third full-length album by Greek extreme metal band Rotting Christ. This album was released in April 1996 on Century Media and was the first album to showcase a steady addition of gothic metal influence to their overall sound.

Track listing
Lyrics by Jim Patsouris & Music by Sakis Tolis. (Copyright Magic Arts Publishing.)
 "King of a Stellar War" – 6:18
 "A Dynasty from the Ice" – 4:29
 "Archon" – 4:11
 "Snowing Still" – 5:42
 "Shadows Follow" – 4:35
 "One with the Forest" – 4:33
 "Diastric Alchemy" – 4:58
 "The Opposite Bank" – 5:54
 "The First Field of the Battle" – 5:37

Personnel
Necromayhem (aka Sakis Tolis) – guitars, vocals
Mutilator – bass
Necrosauron – drums, percussion

Production
Arranged by Rotting Christ
Produced by Rotting Christ & Andy Classen
Recorded, engineered & mixed by Andy Classen

References

External links
Triarchy of the Lost Lovers at Discogs

Rotting Christ albums
1996 albums
Albums produced by Andy Classen